Aleksandr Ivanovich Krotov (born 1895; died 1959) was an association football player.

International career
Krotov played his only game for Russia on 12 July 1914 in a friendly against Norway, scoring a goal in a 1:1 draw.

External links
  Profile

1895 births
1959 deaths
Russian footballers
Russia international footballers
Soviet footballers

Association football midfielders